Andrey Nikolaevich Serdyukov (born 4 March 1962) is a Russian Armed Forces colonel general and commander of the Russian Airborne Troops from 2016 to 2022.

Serdyukov served in the Soviet Airborne Forces as a junior officer and rose to battalion command. He graduated from the Frunze Military Academy and became a deputy regimental commander in the Russian Airborne Troops and then a regimental commander. Serdyukov fought in the First Chechen War and served as a deputy brigade commander in Kosovo, participating in the Incident at Pristina airport. Between 2002 and 2003 he led the 138th Guards Motor Rifle Brigade and in 2004 took command of the 106th Guards Airborne Division.

After graduating from the Military Academy of the General Staff in 2009, Serdyukov became deputy commander of the 5th Red Banner Army, taking command of the army in 2011. In 2013, he became deputy commander and then chief of staff of the Southern Military District. While in this position, Serdyukov led troops in the Annexation of Crimea by the Russian Federation and commanded Russian troops in the Donbass. He became commander of the Russian Airborne Troops in October 2016 and was replaced in June 2022 by Mikhail Teplinsky.

Early life and Soviet military career 
According to official Russian sources, Serdyukov was born on 4 March 1962 in Uglegorsky, Tatsinsky District, Rostov Oblast. Other sources state he was born in Amvrosiivka. In 1983, he graduated from the Ryazan Higher Airborne Command School. He became commander of a reconnaissance platoon of the regimental reconnaissance company in the 104th Guards Airborne Division. Serdyukov became deputy company commander, company commander, chief of staff, deputy battalion commander, and then a battalion commander.

Career in the Russian Armed Forces 
In 1993, Serdyukov graduated from the Frunze Military Academy. He became deputy commander of a regiment in the 76th Guards Airborne Division. Serdyukov fought in the First Chechen War. In 1995 he took command of the 237th Guards Airborne Regiment in the division.  Between 1997 and 1998 he was chief of staff, deputy commander, and commander of the 104th Guards Airborne Regiment in the division. He was later deputy commander of the division.

Serdyukov was for one year a deputy brigade commander of Russian units in Kosovo. In Kosovo, he participated in the Incident at Pristina airport, a standoff between the Russian troops and NATO peacekeeping forces.

Serdyukov served two one-year rotations in Chechnya.

On 10 March 2002, Serdyukov became acting commander of the 138th Guards Motor Rifle Brigade in the Leningrad Military District. He was confirmed in the post on 11 July 2002, and commanded the brigade until 9 June 2003. From June 2004 to 2007, Serdyukov was commander of the 106th Guards Airborne Division.

General staff (2009)
After his 2009 graduation from the Military Academy of the General Staff, Serdyukov became deputy commander of the 5th Red Banner Army. He took command of the army in January 2011.

In February 2013, Serdyukov became deputy commander of the Southern Military District. On 4 October 2013, Serdyukov became chief of staff and first deputy commander of the Southern Military District.

Crimea and Donbass (2014-2015)
Serdyukov led Russian forces in the spring 2014 Annexation of Crimea by the Russian Federation. Using the code name "Sedov", Serdyukov commanded the grouping of Russian troops in the Donbass in August 2015.

As of June 2022, Serdyukov was listed in the Australian "Autonomous Sanctions (Designated Persons and Entities and Declared Persons - Ukraine) List 2014".

Commander airborne troops (2016-2019)
On 4 October 2016, Serdyukov was appointed commander of the Russian Airborne Troops, replacing Colonel General Vladimir Shamanov. He was presented the Airborne flag on 10 October by defense minister Sergey Shoygu.

On 15 September 2017, Serdyukov was seriously injured during an accident on the R21 highway in Murmansk Oblast while supervising Airborne exercises: a Chevrolet Lanos smashed into his minivan, rolling it over. The crash was reported in the Russian media four days later, with Serdyukov reported to be in "satisfactory condition" with a serious craniocerebral trauma and fracture of the back; he was taken to the intensive care unit of the 1469th Naval Military Hospital of the Northern Fleet. Airborne Troops deputy commander Major General Vladimir Kochetkov also suffered fractures, while the driver of the passenger car was killed. Serdyukov recovered by 15 November, when he chaired a meeting of the Military Council of the Airborne Troops.

Syria (2019)
From 10 April 2019 to late September 2019, he was the Commander of the troops for the Russian military intervention in the Syrian Civil War to Syria.

CSTO Peacekeepers to Kazakhstan (2022)
On January 7, 2022, he was appointed Commander of the CSTO peacekeeping forces in Kazakhstan.

Russian invasion of Ukraine (2022)
On 2 February 2022, Serdyukov was rumoured by the Financial Times to be commander of Russian troops that would be sent into Ukraine, if such an action would be taken.

On 19 June 2022, it was reported by Odessa military-civilian spokesperson Serhiy Bratchuk that Vladimir Putin had sacked Serdyukov for his doomed bid to take Hostomel airfield in which few of the invading soldiers survived. This was confirmed by Russian media reports. He was replaced by Colonel General Mikhail Teplinsky. After his dismissal, Serdyukov was sent to Syria to command the Russian Group of Forces in that country.

Awards 
Serdyukov has received the following awards.
 Hero of the Russian Federation (2016)
 Order "For Merit to the Fatherland" 3rd class and 4th class (with Swords)
 Order of Alexander Nevsky
 Order of Courage
 Order of Honour 
 Order for Service to the Homeland in the Armed Forces of the USSR 3rd class
 Order of Military Merit
 Honoured Military Specialist of the Russian Federation

References 

1962 births
Living people
Russian colonel generals
People from Tatsinsky District
Personnel of the Soviet Airborne Forces
Recipients of the Order of Courage
Recipients of the Order of Military Merit (Russia)
Frunze Military Academy alumni
Recipients of the Order "For Merit to the Fatherland", 3rd class
Recipients of the Order of Alexander Nevsky
Recipients of the Order of Honour (Russia)
Ryazan Guards Higher Airborne Command School alumni
Military Academy of the General Staff of the Armed Forces of Russia alumni
Heroes of the Russian Federation
People of the annexation of Crimea by the Russian Federation
Russian military personnel of the Syrian civil war